Patriots of Russia was a political party in Russia. It was established in April 2005 by Gennady Semigin, who was expelled from the Communist Party of the Russian Federation after he failed in a power struggle with Gennady Zyuganov.

History
In 2006 Gennadiy Semigin and his new party “Patriots of Russia” joined the Rodina faction in the Duma. Following Rodina's merger with the Russian Party of Life and the Russian Pensioners' Party under the leadership of Sergey Mironov in October 2006 to form the A Just Russia party, “Patriots of Russia” declared its intention to run as a separate party in the 2007 elections.

In 2008, the Party of Russia's Rebirth and Party of Peace and Unity teamed up with the party of Patriots of Russia  In the 2016 State Duma elections, one of its candidates was Alexander Rutskoy, former Vice President of Russia.

The Patriots of Russia announced that they would not run in the 2018 Russian presidential election and that the party would support current president Vladimir Putin for the elections.

On 22 February 2021, the party united with the party For Truth, which subsequently merged into the A Just Russia party.

Ideology
The party was officially statist collectivist. The party had many of the same policy positions as the Communist Party of the Russian Federation.

Electoral results

Presidential

Legislative elections

Regions

Until 2011, the party had fractions in regional parliaments: the Kaliningrad region, Yaroslavl region, Republic of Dagestan, in the city of Kemerovo. 19 deputies in the regions of the referred from other parties.

13 September 2012, the party withdrew its candidate for the post of Governor of Ryazan region and supported the candidate from the ruling party United Russia.

14 October 2012, in the regional elections in the Republic of North Ossetia received (61039) 26,57% and is represented in the regional Parliament 14 deputies.

References

External links
The official site of party 

2005 establishments in Russia
2021 disestablishments in Russia
A Just Russia
Defunct nationalist parties in Russia
Formerly registered political parties in Russia
Political parties disestablished in 2021
Political parties established in 2005
Russian nationalist parties
Defunct socialist parties in Russia
Democratic socialist parties in Europe
Left-wing nationalist parties